Andrew John Berger (August 30, 1915 – July 4, 1995) was an American ornithologist from the American Museum of Natural History.

Berger was born in Warren, Ohio on August 30, 1915.  In 1939 he graduated from Oberlin College. After doing fieldwork in game management from 1940 to 1941, he married Edith Grace Denniston in 1942. The couple had two children, John Denniston Berger and Diana Marie Berger. From 1941 to 1946, he served as a commissioned officer in the U.S. Army Air Corps; he continued his military service in the US Air Force Reserve and reached the rank of lieutenant colonel. In 1950 he obtained his PhD in zoology from the University of Michigan.  From 1951 through 1963 he taught gross anatomy at the University of Michigan Medical School. He also conducted research on natural history and breeding behavior of the Kirtland's warbler (and other avian species) from the early 1950s through the end of 1963.

In 1964 he accepted an invitation to spend the spring semester as guest professor at the University of Hawaii-Manoa, and in 1965, after spending a year teaching and doing research at the University of Baroda (India), he returned to Hawaii and served two terms as the Chairman of the UH-Manoa Zoology Department.

Berger was a member of the American Ornithologists Union and the Michigan Audubon Society. Although his early interests included the morphology, behavior and classification of birds from the cuckoo family, from 1965 onward he specialized in researching and documenting the history and living conditions of the endemic avian species of the Hawaiian islands. He often spoke out against various state government agencies and related special interest groups when they advocated policies that threatened the survival of rare and endangered species.

His best known and most enduring books are those about Hawaiian avifauna (especially the Hawaiian goose). He also wrote books on avian and human anatomy, and also an article from 1957 where he describes the extinct Bourbon crested starling and its relationship to other bird families.

He died in Hawaii on July 4, 1995.

Works
1957 On the anatomy and relationships of Fregilupus varius, an extinct starling from the Mascarene Islands (Bulletin of the AMNH; v. 113, article 3)
1964 Elementary Human Anatomy 
1966 Avian myology
1967 Hawaii's birds
1971 Fundamentals of Ornithology 
1971 Bird Study
1972 Hawaiian birdlife
1976 Fundamentals of Ornithology, 2nd Edition
1977 The exotic birds of Hawaii 
1980 Hawaiian Goose – An Experiment of Conservation
1981 Hawaiian Birdlife, 2nd Edition

References

External links

Smithsonian Institution Archives
Andrew John Berger Papers, 1947–1978
Andrew John Berger Papers, 1947–1983
Andrew John Berger Papers, 1952–1982
Andrew John Berger Papers, c. 1954–1980
Andrew John Berger Papers, c. 1965–1982
Andrew J. Berger Papers, c. 1980–1990

American ornithologists
Oberlin College alumni
People from Warren, Ohio
1915 births
1995 deaths
People associated with the American Museum of Natural History
University of Michigan alumni
20th-century American zoologists